Harold Floyd "Tina" Brooks (June 7, 1932 – August 13, 1974) was an American jazz  tenor saxophonist and composer best remembered for his work in the hard bop style.

Early years
Harold Floyd Brooks was born in Fayetteville, North Carolina, and was the brother of David "Bubba" Brooks. The nickname "Tina", pronounced Teena, was a variation of "Teeny", a childhood moniker. His favourite tune was "My Devotion". He studied harmony and theory with Herbert Bourne.

Initially, he studied the C-melody saxophone, which he began playing shortly after he moved to New York with his family in 1944. Brooks' first professional work came in 1951 with rhythm and blues pianist Sonny Thompson, and in 1955 Brooks played with vibraphonist Lionel Hampton. Brooks also received less formal guidance from trumpeter and composer "Little" Benny Harris, who led the saxophonist to his first recording as a leader. Harris recommended Brooks to Blue Note producer Alfred Lion in 1958.

Recordings
Brooks is best known for his recordings for the Blue Note label between 1958 and 1961, recording as a sideman with Kenny Burrell, Freddie Hubbard, Jackie McLean, Freddie Redd, and Jimmy Smith. Around the same period, Brooks was McLean's understudy in The Connection, a play by Jack Gelber with music by Redd, and performed on an album of music from the play on Felsted Records, a session which also featured Howard McGhee.

Brooks recorded five sessions of his own for Blue Note (including one jointly with McLean). The first session was recorded on March 16, 1958 at the Van Gelder Studio in Hackensack, New Jersey, and featured trumpeter Lee Morgan alongside seasoned professionals such as Sonny Clark, Doug Watkins and Art Blakey. However, for unknown reasons Minor Move was not released for more than two decades, several years after Brooks had died. This started an unfortunate trend, as three of his four other sessions (Street Singer, Back to the Tracks and The Waiting Game) did not appear during his lifetime. The exception was True Blue, a session recorded on June 25, 1960 with Freddie Hubbard, Duke Jordan, Sam Jones and Art Taylor. The release of True Blue coincided with the release of Hubbard's Blue Note debut album, Open Sesame (also featuring Brooks, who wrote the opening title track as well as "Gypsy Blue"), and was not actively promoted.

Brooks did not record after 1961. Plagued by heroin dependency, and gradually deteriorating health, he died of liver failure aged 42.

Legacy
Michael Cuscuna in 1985, through Mosaic Records, released a boxset of Brooks' recordings as leader; the limited edition is out of print. The interest in Brooks' music has also led to releases of the unissued sessions through Blue Note Japan and on CD in Blue Note's Connoisseur series.

In the liner notes for the CD release of Back to the Tracks, Cuscuna wrote: "Far lesser talents have been far more celebrated" and that Brooks "was a unique, sensitive improviser who could weave beautiful and complex tapestries through his horn. His lyricism, unity of ideas and inner logic were astounding."

David Rosenthal in his book Hard Bop: Jazz and Black Music 1955-1965 wrote about Brooks. Of his composition "Street Singer", Rosenthal wrote that it is "an authentic hard-bop classic" where "pathos, irony and rage come together in a performance at once anguished and sinister."

The official Blue Note website says of Brooks: "With a strong, smooth tone and an amazing flow of fresh ideas every time he soloed, tenor saxophonist Tina Brooks should have been a major jazz artist, but his legacy is confined to a series of dates that he did for Blue Note as a sideman and leader" and that he "was one of the most brilliant, if underrated, tenor saxophonists in modern jazz."

Discography
All on Blue Note Records, unless otherwise indicated.

As leader/co-leader 
 1958: Minor Move (1980)
 1960: True Blue (1960)
 1960: Street Singer with Jackie McLean (1980) – Japan only
 1960: Back to the Tracks (1998)
 1961: The Waiting Game (2002)

As sideman 
With Kenny Burrell
 Blue Lights Volume 1 & 2 (1958)
 On View at the Five Spot Cafe (1959)
 Swingin' (1980) – recorded in 1956–59

With Freddie Hubbard
 Open Sesame (1960)

With Howard McGhee 
 Music from the Connection (Felsted, 1960)

With Jackie McLean 
 Jackie's Bag (1961) – recorded in 1959–60

With Freddie Redd
 Shades of Redd (1960)
 Redd's Blues (1988) – recorded in 1961

With Jimmy Smith
 House Party (1958) – recorded in 1957-58
 The Sermon! (1959) – recorded in 1957-58
 Cool Blues (1980) – recorded in 1958

With Sonny Thompson 
 Sonny Thompson and his Orchestra (King, 1951)

References

External links
Tina Brooks at the Hard Bop Home Page

1932 births
1974 deaths
African-American jazz musicians
American jazz musicians
American jazz tenor saxophonists
Blue Note Records artists
Hard bop saxophonists
Musicians from the Bronx
Post-bop saxophonists
Deaths from liver failure
20th-century American saxophonists
Jazz musicians from New York (state)
American male saxophonists
20th-century American male musicians
American male jazz musicians
20th-century African-American musicians